Catarhoe basochesiata is a moth of the family Geometridae. It is found in Europe. It was first described by Philogène Duponchel in 1831 as Cidaria basochesiata. The forewings vary in colour from reddish brown to greyish brown, with some moths having very dark brown forewings that poorly contrast with the patterns on them. The moth can be found across the western Mediterranean, from the Iberian Peninsula across France and into Italy and from Morocco to Tunisia.

References

Xanthorhoini
Moths described in 1831